The Synchronised swimming competition at the 2013 World Aquatics Championships was held from July 20 to July 27 at the Palau Sant Jordi, Barcelona, Spain.

Schedule

Medal summary

Medal table

Record(*)

Events

*Reserve

References

 
2013 World Aquatics Championships
2013 in synchronized swimming
Synchronised swimming at the World Aquatics Championships